A mantua (from the French  or "mantle") is an article of women's clothing worn in the late 17th century and 18th century. Initially a loose gown, the later mantua was an overgown or robe typically worn over stays, stomacher and a co-ordinating petticoat.

Instead of a bodice and skirt cut separately, the mantua hung from the shoulders to the floor (like dresses of earlier periods). It started as the female version of the men's banyan, worn for 'undress' wear. Gradually it developed into a draped and pleated dress and eventually evolved into a dress worn looped and draped up over a contrasting petticoat and a stomacher. The mantua-and-stomacher resulted in a high, square neckline in contrast to the broad, off-the-shoulder neckline previously in fashion. The new look was more modest and covered-up than previous fashions and decidedly fussy, with bows, frills, ribbons, and other trim, but the short string of pearls and pearl earrings or 'eardrops' worn since the 1630s remained popular.

The mantua, made from a single length of fabric pleated to fit with a long train, was ideal for showing the designs of the new elaborately patterned silks that replaced the solid-colored satins popular in the mid-century.

Etymology
The origins of the term 'mantua', to mean "a robe", are unclear. The garment may have been named after Mantua, in Italy, a centre of production for some of the expensive silks that would have been used to make up such garments.

From this garment arose the term 'mantua-maker', an early term for a women's dressmaker.

Evolution of the mantua

The earliest mantuas emerged in the late 17th century as a comfortable alternative to the boned bodices and separate skirts then widely worn.

The mantua featured elbow-length, cuffed sleeves, and the overskirt was typically drawn back over the hips to expose the petticoat beneath. In the earliest mantuas, the long trained skirt was allowed to trail. From about 1710, it became customary to pin up the train. The construction of the mantua was altered so that once the train was pinned up, the exposed reverse of the train showed the proper face of the fabric or embroidery. One of the earliest extant examples of this, dated to 1710–1720, is in the Victoria and Albert Museum's collections.

By the mid-18th century, the mantua had evolved into a formal version principally worn for court dress. The draping of the overskirt became increasingly stylized, with the back panel of the train almost entirely concealed.

The final version of the mantua, which emerged around 1780, bore little resemblance to the original mantua of nearly a century earlier. Instead of earlier elaborate draperies and folds, the train had evolved into a length of fabric attached to the back of the bodice, as illustrated in an example in the Victoria and Albert Museum.

Surviving examples

Extant examples of the 17th-century mantua are extremely scarce. Perhaps the only known extant adult-size example is an embroidered wool mantua and petticoat in the Metropolitan Museum of Art's Costume Institute. Norah Waugh has published a pattern taken from this mantua. The Victoria and Albert Museum owns an extremely rare late 17th-century fashion doll dressed in a pink silk mantua and petticoat.

Also in the Costume Institute is a mantua and petticoat in salmon pink bizarre silk dated to 1708. Another early mantua, the silk dated to roughly 1708–09 belongs to the Clive House Museum, Shrewsbury; a pattern for this mantua has been taken by Janet Arnold.

Most mantuas preserved in museum collections are formal versions from the mid-18th century, intended for court dress. The Berrington Hall mantua of the 1760s in Berrington Hall, most likely worn by Ann Harley (née Bangham) as Lady Mayoress of London, and a blue silk mantua with matching stomacher and petticoat dated ca. 1750-65 in the collection of the Metropolitan Museum of Art's Costume Institute, are examples of this type of mantua.

See also

1650–1700 in fashion
1700–1750 in fashion

References

Further reading
 Janet Arnold: Patterns of Fashion 1 (cut and construction of women's clothing, 1660–1860) Wace 1964, Macmillan 1972.
 Janet Arnold et al.: Patterns of fashion 6, The content, cut, construction and context of women's European dress c. 1695-1795. London: The School of Historical Dress. pp. 64–67.  .

External links 

 Eighteenth-century silhouette and support, covering mantuas, at the Metropolitan Museum
 Recreation of three mantuas, at Colonial Williamsburg
 Fashion History Timeline:Mantuas from the Fashion Institute of Technology.

17th-century fashion
18th-century fashion
Dresses
French clothing
Gowns
History of clothing (Western fashion)
Robes and cloaks